The 1977–78 Minnesota North Stars season was the 11th season for the North Stars. The North Stars were in financial trouble, and at season's end had the worst record in the league at 18–53–9. In June 1978, with both the North Stars and the Cleveland Barons on the verge of folding, the league approved an arrangement in which the two teams were permitted to merge under the ownership of Barons owner George Gund III. The merged franchise continued as the Minnesota North Stars, but assumed the Barons' old place in the Adams Division.

Offseason

NHL Draft

Regular season

Final standings

Schedule and results

Transactions

Trades

Player statistics

Skaters

Note: GP = Games played; G = Goals; A = Assists; Pts = Points; +/- = Plus/minus; PIM = Penalty minutes

Goaltenders
Note: GP = Games played; TOI = Time on ice (minutes); W = Wins; L = Losses; OT = Overtime losses; GA = Goals against; SO = Shutouts; SV% = Save percentage; GAA = Goals against average

Playoffs

Awards and records

References
 North Stars on Hockey Database

Minnesota North Stars seasons
Minnesota North Stars
Minnesota North Stars
Minnesota North Stars season
Minnesota North Stars season